Bosara maior is a moth in the family Geometridae that is endemic to Sri Lanka.

References

Moths described in 2002
Endemic fauna of Sri Lanka
Moths of Asia
Eupitheciini